The Chubb Fellowship is a fellowship based and administered through Timothy Dwight College, one of Yale University's twelve residential colleges, and is one of Yale's highest honors for a visiting lecturer. In 1936, Hendon Chubb established a fund for “…the encouragement and aid of students interested in government and public affairs.” In 1949, Chubb and the Master of Timothy Dwight College collaborated to create a visiting fellowship program as the principal means to achieve this goal.

Past Fellows 
There have been many nationally and internationally distinguished personalities who have been named as Chubb Fellows. They include many heads of state, other national and international political leaders, Nobel and Pulitzer prize winners, and a wide range of highly accomplished individuals in business, non-profit management and the arts. Following is the list.

2010s 
 Samantha Power
 Leymah Gbowee 
 Wendell Berry
 Leonel Fernández 
 Aung San Suu Kyi 
 Shah Rukh Khan 
 Morgan Freeman 
 Nicholas Kristof
 John DeStefano Jr.
 Susan Rice
 Norman Mineta
 Paul Simon

2000s 
 Carlos Fuentes 
 Chinua Achebe
 Tzipi Livni
 Robert Farris Thompson
 Ellen Johnson Sirleaf 
 Wynton Marsalis
 Ted Sorensen
 Matt Hughes
 Cesar Pelli
 Rita Dove
 Gloria Steinem
 Steve Reich
 Elie Wiesel
 Christine Brennan
 Harry Belafonte
 Sofia Coppola
 Frank Gehry
 David Halberstam
 Richard Pound
 Mikhail Baryshnikov
 Richard Leakey
 Ruth Simmons
 Edward James Olmos
 Eddie Palmieri
 Mel Martinez
 Gary Locke
 Tadao Ando
 George Pataki
 Yevgeny Yevtushenko
 George H. W. Bush

1990s 
 Tito Puente
 Judith Rodin
 George Pataki
 H.E. Dr. Oscar Arias Sanchez
 Joseph Lieberman
 R.W. Apple
 John G. Rowland
 Curtis Hanson
 Phil Gramm
 Henry Louis Gates
 Lord David Wilson of Tillyorn
 Jack Kemp
 Shimon Peres
 Dr. Zbigniew Brzezinski
 Richard Hayward
 Norman Mailer
 John Rowland
 Wilma Mankiller
 Harry A. Blackmun
 Walter Cronkite
 Rudolph Giuliani
 Christine Todd Whitman
 Jean Bertrand Aristide
 David N. Dinkins
 Sylvia Temkin
 Dr. Benny Temkin
 John F. Kerry
 Cardinal Jean-Marie Lustiger
 Hans Brunhart
 Sebastiao Salgado
 Andre Milongo
 Lowell P. Weicker
 Richard M. Daley
 Willie Colon
 Octavio Paz
 Fernando Collor de Mello
 Chai Ling

1980s 
 Toni Morrison
 Amine Gemayel
 Robert T. Matsui
 Mario Vargas Llosa
 Edward Kennedy
 Rafael Hernandez Colon
 Hanif Kureishi
 Thomas Eagleton
 Patricia Schroeder
 Randall Robinson
 Ntozake Shange
 David Steel
 Mieczyslaw Maneli
 Boleslaw Wierzbianski
 Joanna Rostropowicz Clark
 Michael Kaufman
 William Styron
 Jerzy Kosinski
 Irving Kristol
 Raul Alfonsin
 Moshe Arens
 Henry Cisneros
 Simon Wiesenthal
 Peter Ueberroth
 Bruce Babbitt
 Richard Thornburgh
 Betty Frieda
 Mario Cuomo
 Nicole Hollander
 Amhadou Ahidjo
 Robert McNamara
 Jesse Jackson
 Wole Soyinka
 Jerzy Milewski
 Bruce Morrison
 Teddy Kolek
 Norman Mailer
 Matodja Gazon
 Alexander Haig
 Shirley Ann Williams
 Buchi Emecheta
 Paule Marshall
 Alice Walker
 Walter Mondale
 John Lehman
 Sol Linowitz
 Lord Killanin
 Harry A. Blackmun
 Moshe Dayan
 John Kenneth Galbraith

1970s 
 Robert Redford
 Moshe Dayan
 Gary Hart
 Jack Kemp
 Shirley Temple
 Nancy Landon Kassebaum
 Edward I. Koch
 Abraham A. Ribicoff
 Vernon E. Jordan
 Henry M. Jackson
 Santiago Carrillo, Secretary General of the Communist Party of Spain, 1977–78
 Kenneth A. Gibson, Mayor of Newark 1977–78
 Edward H. Levi, U.S. Attorney General; president, The University of Chicago, 1976–77
 Gerald R. Ford, President of the U.S.; Vice-President of the U.S.; U.S. Congressman, 1976–77
 George H.W. Bush, 41st President of the U.S.; Vice-President of the U.S.; CIA Director, 1976–77
 Morris K. Udall, U.S. Congressman; Charman, Committee of Interior and Insular Affairs, 1976–77
 Michael Harrington, Socialist Writer, 1976–77
 Reubin O'D. Askew, Governor of Florida, 1976–77
 Charles McCurdy Mathias, U.S. Senator, 1975–76
 Ella T. Grasso, Governor of Connecticut, 1975–76
 Daniel Patrick Moynihan, U.S. Permanent Representative to the U.N.; U.S. Senator, 1975–76
 James R. Schlesinger, Secretary of Defense, 1975–76
 Joseph Biden, U.S. Senator, 1975–76
 Mario Soares, Secretary General of the Socialist Party of Portugal; Prime Minister of Portugal, 1975–76
 David L. Boren, Governor of Oklahoma; U.S. Senator, 1975–76
 Edward Heath, former Prime Minister of the United Kingdom, 1975–76
 Maynard Jackson, Mayor of Atlanta, 1974–75
 Hubert H. Humphrey, Vice President of the United States; U.S. Senator, 1974–75
 F. Bradford Morse, U.S. Congressman; Under Secretary General, The United Nations, 1974–75
 Jimmy Carter, President of the United States; Governor of Georgia, 1974–75
 John V. Lindsay, U.S. Congressman; Mayor of New York City, 1974–75
 Thomas O. Enders, Assistant Secretary of State; Ambassador from the U.S. to Canada, 1974–75
 Benjamin C. Bradlee, Executive Editor, The Washington Post, 1974–75
 Samuel Archibald, Conference on Film and Politics, 1973–74
 Thomas Patterson, Conference on Film and Politics, 1973–74
 Charles Guggenheim, Conference on Film and Politics, 1973–74
 Emile de Antonio, Conference on Film and Politics, 1973–74
 William Taylor, Conference on Film and Politics, 1973–74
 Elliot Lee Richardson, Secretary, H.E.W.; Secretary of Defense, U.S. Attorney General, 1973–74
 Jesse Jackson, Civil Rights Leader; Director, Operation PUSH, 1973–74
 Sam J. Ervin, Jr., U.S. Senator, 1973–74
 Les Aspin, U.S. Congressman,; Chairman, House Armed Services Committee, 1973–74
 Marya Mannes, Writer, 1973–74
 Alan S. Paton, Writer; President of the South African Liberal Party, 1972–73
 Edward R. Roybal, U.S. Congressman, 1972–73
 Ralph Nader, Consumer Advocate, 1972–73
 Bob Eckhardt, U.S. Congressman, 1972–73
 William Benton, U.S. Senator; Publisher of Encyclopædia Britannica, 1972–73
 Lowell Weicker, U.S. Congressman, Senator, 1972–73
 Yvonne Brathwaite Burke, U.S. Congresswoman, 1972–73
 Willard Gaylin, Conference on the Works of B.F. Skinner, 1971–72
 Andrew Greeley, Conference on the Works of B.F. Skinner, 1971–72
 Zbigniew Brzezinski, Conference on the Works of B.F. Skinner, 1971–72
 Alain Enthoven, Conference on the Works of B.F. Skinner, 1971–72
 D.W. Brogan, Conference on the Works of B.F. Skinner, 1971–72
 Brand Blanchard, Conference on the Works of B.F. Skinner, 1971–72
 Paul Ricoeur, Conference on the Works of B.F. Skinner, 1971–72
 Rollo May, Conference on the Works of B.F. Skinner, 1971–72
 Stephen Spender, Conference on the Works of B.F. Skinner, 1971–72
 B.F. Skinner, Conference on the Works of B.F. Skinner, 1971–72
 Sir John Masterman, Writer, 1971–72
 Charles D. Diggs, Jr.U.S. Congressman, 1971–72
 Anthony Lake, Conference on the Presidency, 1971–72
 Joseph Califano, Conference on the Presidency, 1971–72
 Arthur Schlesinger, Conference on the Presidency, 1971–72
 Eugene Rostow, Conference on the Presidency, 1971–72
 Beth Corona, Civil Rights Leader, 1970–71
 Kate Millet, Writer, 1970–71
 George Ball, Undersecretary of State, 1970–71
 Charles Evers, Mayor of Fayette, Mississippi, 1970–71
 Bayard Rustin, Civil Rights Leader; Director, A. Phillipe Randolph Institute, 1970–71
 John Henrik Clark, Conference on the Black Woman, 1970–71
 Gwendolyn Brooks, Conference on the Black Woman, 1970–71
 Shirley Graham DeBois, Conference on the Black Woman, 1970–71
 Maya Angelou, Conference on the Black Woman, 1970–71

1960s 
 Sir William Armstrong, Head of the British Civil Service 1969–70
 Dr. Edwin H. Land, President of Polaroid Corporation 1969–70
 Richard D. McCarthy, U.S. Congressman 1969–70
 Carl B. Stokes, Mayor of Cleveland 1968–69
 James Farmer, Director of Congress Racial Equality; Assistant Secretary, HEW 1968–69
 George H.W. Bush41st President of the U.S.; Vice-President of the U.S.; CIA Director 1968–69
 C. N. Annadurai, Chief Minister of Madras 1967–68
 Theodore R. McKeldin, Mayor of Baltimore 1967–68
 Robert Taft, U.S. Congressman; U.S. Senator 1967–68
 Ronald Reagan, President of the U.S.; Governor of California 1967–68
 John V. Tunney, U.S. Congressman; U.S. Senator 1966–67
 Jonathan B. Bingham, U.S. Congressman 1966–67
 Richard C. Lee, Mayor of New Haven 1966–67
 Robert Smylie, Governor of Idaho 1966–67
 Lt. General Sir John Bago Glubb 1966–67
 Robert Wagner, Mayor of New York City 1965–66
 Lord Head, High Commissioner, Malaysia 1965–66
 Richard Bolling, U.S. Congressman 1965–66
 Henry Luce, Publisher, Time Inc. 1964–65
 John Chafee, Governor of Rhode Island 1964–65
 Terry Sanford, Governor of North Carolina 1964–65
 Joseph S. Clark, U.S. Senator 1963–64
 Thomas Ludlow Ashley, U.S. Congressman 1963–64
 Robert do Oliveira Campos, Ambassador from Brazil to the U.S. 1963–64
 John Lindsay, U.S. Congressman; Mayor of New York City 1962–63
 Sir Richard Allen, Ambassador from United Kingdom to Burma 1962–63
 Joseph Grimond, M.P., House of Commons; Leader of Liberal Party 1962–63
 Jess Unruh, Speaker of the California Assembly 1962–63
 Barry Goldwater, U.S. Senator; Republican candidate for president, 1964 1961–62
 Arnold D. P. Heeney, Ambassador from Canada to the U.S. 1961–62
 John Sherman Cooper, U.S. Senator 1961–62
 Sir Charles P. Snow, Novelist, Educator and Scientist 1961–62
 Dr. Hastings Banda, Chairman, Malawi Congress Party; President of Malawi 1960–61
 Sir Henry Willink, Master, Magdalene College, Cambridge 1960–61
 Ralph McGill, Publisher and Editor, The Atlanta Constitution 1960–61
 Herbert Matthews, New York Times correspondent 1960–61

1950s 
 Koichiro Asakai, Ambassador from Japan to the U.S., 1959–60
 Sir Leslie Munro, Permanent Representative of New Zealand to the U.N., 1959–60
 Edmund S. Muskie, U.S. Senator, 1959–60
 Herbert Brownell, Jr., U.S. Attorney General, 1959–60
 Stephen M. Young, U.S. Senator, 1959–60
 Adlai E. Stevenson Governor of Illinois; Democratic candidate for president, 1952 & 1956, 1958–59
 Sir Harold Caccia, Ambassador from United Kingdom to U.S., 1958–59
 John Martin Vorys, U.S. Congressman, 1958–59
 Dr. Najib-Ullah, Ambassador from Afghanistan to U.S., 1958–59
 Prescott Bush, U.S. Senator, 1958–59
 G. Mennen Williams, Governor of Michigan, 1957–58
 Harry S. Truman, President of the United States, 1957–58
 Raymond E. Baldwin, U.S. Senator; Justice of Supreme Court of Errors, Connecticut, 1957–58
 Walter J. Kohler, Governor of Wisconsin, 1957–58
 Dennis W. Brogan, British Political Scientist, 1957–58
 Chester Bowles, Governor of Connecticut, 1956–57
 Clement Richard, Earl Attlee, Prime Minister, United Kingdom, 1956–57
 Harry P. Cain, U.S. Senator, 1956–57
 Hermini Portell-Vila, Historian, 1956–57
 William A. Robson, British Political Scientist, 1956–57
 Charles M. Spofford, Chairman, NATO Council of Ministers, 1955–56
 John A. Costello, Prime Minister of Ireland, 1955–56
 Frank P. Graham, U.S. Senator; United Nations Mediator, 1955–56
 Arthur H. Dean, U.S. Ambassador to Korea, 1954–55
 Roger N. Baldwin, Chairman, National Committee of American Civil Liberties Union, 1954–55
 Dean Acheson, U.S. Secretary of State, 1954–55
 Hugh Gregg, Governor of New Hampshire, 1954–55
 Brendan Gill, Editor, The New Yorker, 1954–55
 Leslie C. Stevens, Vice-Admiral (USN), Naval Attach, 1953–54
 T.V. Smith, U.S. Congressman, 1953–54
 Stephen K. Bailey, Mayor of Middletown, CT, 1953–54
 Abraham A. Ribicoff, U.S. Senator, 1952–53
 Edward Weeks, Editor, The Atlantic Monthly, 1952–53
 Richardson Dilworth, Mayor of Philadelphia, 1952–53
 David Riesman, Social Scientist, 1952–53
 John Alsop, Connecticut Legislator, 1951–52
 Arthur Koestler, Writer, 1951–52
 Ernest K. Lindley, Washington Editor, Newsweek, 1951–52
 Richard Rovere, Columnist, The New Yorker, 1950–51
 Paul H. Appleby, Professor, Public Administration, 1950–51
 James W. Clise, Vice President of National Municipal League of New York City, 1950–51
 Silliman Evans, Newspaper Publisher, 1950–51
 Charles W. Eliot, Planning Consultant, 1950–51

1940s 
 Newbold Morris, president, New York City Council, 1949–50
 Russell Lynes, Editor, Harper's Magazine, 1949–50
 Lewis Mumford, Planner, Writer, 1949–50
 Louis Brownlow, Public Administration Clearing House, 1949–50

References

Yale University
Fellowships
Academic awards